The Hutchinson River is a freshwater stream located in the Bronx and Southern Westchester, New York. The river forms in Scarsdale at Brookline Road and flows 10 miles (16 km) south until it empties into Eastchester Bay in the New York City borough of the Bronx.
The river provides the basis for the jagged city line at the northwest of New Rochelle, where it abuts  Scarsdale and then Eastchester; further downstream and south, it plays a similar role between  Mount Vernon and Pelham.

The river is named for Anne Hutchinson, who came from Rhode Island in 1642 and settled on Pelham Neck to the east of the river, across from where Co-op City is now. She and all but one of her children were killed by Indians the following year in Kieft's War .

Navigation
The Hutchinson River is navigable for its southernmost . Tugs and barges and the occasional small tanker still make their way to the terminals that are still operating. The northernmost active terminal, Sprague Energy located at 100 Canal St. in Mount Vernon, still accepts barges of heating oil, ULSD, and biodiesel blends daily. The other two active docks are PASCAP, which exports scrap metal, and the former Colonial Sand and Gravel dock, which accepts scows full of aggregate to make cement and asphalt. The river is suffering from neglect, and although it was dredged in 2010, the northernmost section was not and is filling in with silt. Only shallow draft barges can reach Sprague terminal and only at high water; at lower tides squat can cause barges to beach. The northernmost dock in the dredged project, Imperia Brothers Inc., has not been able to accept a scow of aggregates since 2007 due to the silt build-up.

Crossings

Six bridges span the river's navigable section, carrying rail and automobile traffic. They are, from downstream heading upstream: Pelham Bridge (movable), Amtrak's Pelham Bay Bridge (movable), Hutchinson River Parkway (movable), New England Thruway (fixed), and Eastchester Bridge (Boston Post Road) (fixed), in the Bronx; and Fulton Avenue Bridge in Pelham Manor (movable). The movable bridges still employ tenders and open daily for maritime traffic.

Reservoirs
The New Rochelle Water Company dammed the Hutchinson River at three places between 1886 and 1907, creating three reservoirs at the northern end of the community. The Westchester County Park Commission purchased the reservoirs and the surrounding water shed property in 1927, for parkland and parkway purposes. A part of the land was used for the Hutchinson River Parkway, which follows the river for most of its distance.

The three reservoirs are numbered in the order they were built. Reservoir No. 1, which is now known as Lake Innisfree, is furthest upstream, and was constructed in 1886. Lake Innisfree is the largest of the reservoirs. It is mostly surrounded by private land, but its dam and part of its eastern shore can be accessed on foot by the Leatherstocking Trail. Reservoir 3 and Reservoir 2 are both contained within Twin Lakes County Park and are accessible by the Leatherstocking Trail and other trails. The three reservoirs are no longer used as a water supply.

See also
Anne Hutchinson
List of New York rivers

References

External links
 

Geography of New Rochelle, New York
Geography of the Bronx
Long Island Sound
Rivers of New York (state)
Rivers of the Bronx
Rivers of Westchester County, New York